Girl Fight is a television film that premiered on Lifetime on October 3, 2011. Inspired by true events, the film revolves around a bullied and troubled 16-year-old girl who tries to fit in with a popular group of girls, leading to a brutal beating upon joining the clique.

The film was inspired by a 2008 beating in Florida; a video of some of the beating, released by Polk County Sheriff Grady Judd, was used heavily by the news media and the story caused nationwide public outrage. Additionally, Anne Heche and James Tupper who play Haley's parents, were a couple in real life until their split in 2018.

Plot

Haley Macklin (Jodelle Ferland) is an academically advanced high school student. She sees herself as an outsider because she has skipped a grade. Her intelligence and well-articulated contributions to class discussions cause her classmates to become jealous. Frustrated that she is left out from a popular group of girls, she posts negative comments about them on a social networking website.

Unexpectedly, she befriends Alexa Simons (Tess Atkins), a popular girl in school who is head over heels for Derek (Rady Panov). Haley offers to help Alexa with her schoolwork. Haley soon breaks the social barrier between her and the popular girls and is accepted by most of them. The girls with whom she does not make a connection are slightly suspicious of her. Haley's behavior changes drastically. She disobeys her parents and is rude to her sister. Her mother, Melissa (Anne Heche) endeavors to make allowances for Haley's attitude and is more lenient than her father, Ray (James Tupper).

One day, the popular girls discover the harsh comments that Haley posted online and they feel betrayed. The girls decide to physically attack Haley, while videotaping it. They also plan to post the images online. Clueless about this revenge plot, Haley is invited over to Alexa's house. The girls are waiting by the door and once Haley steps inside, the girls taunt her, calling her names and savagely beat her, until she falls unconscious, suffering a concussion, a ruptured eardrum, and a damaged left eye in the process. The entire beating is recorded on video with the girls planning to post this online. After the brutal attack, Haley wakes up bruised, bloody, confused, and helpless in front of the girls who continue to taunt her. They then abandon her in a parking lot with a cell phone. However, within a few seconds after the girls flee, a nearby woman comes to Haley's aid.

When Melissa and Ray discover what the girls had done to Haley, Melissa confronts Alexa and her two friends that took part in the beating, Kristin and Taylor, only to be deterred from seeing the footage after the girls make false statements and refuse to give in. Drawing suspicion from Alexa's grandmother, Marylou (Linda Darlow), she attempts to retrieve Taylor's phone to see the footage herself, but Kristin and Taylor hastily escape the house via Alexa's open sliding door. Marylou then tries to get Taylor's phone number from Alexa's contacts list, but is left shocked and disappointed when she sees a video frame of Haley's bloodied and bruised face on Alexa's computer screen.

Haley's parents receive the footage of the brutal beating, now stored in a USB flash drive, from Marylou. After viewing it, Melissa and Ray decide to take serious action against the girls, by alerting authorities. Infuriated that Marylou had given Haley's parents the footage, Alexa flees and goes to Kristin's house. However, her house is traced by police, who arrive and arrest them, along with Taylor and the two other girls that took part in the beating, Becca and Lauren, and are charged with kidnapping and battery, and are later released on bail. Alexa, who had conspired in the beating, is regarded by the media and police as the ringleader. At high school, students cheer the girls for what they did. However, Becca, disturbed after watching the video herself, regrets what she did and discontinue her relationship with the girls. While the kids at school think the girls are "cool", people from around the country have seen the video, causing nationwide public outrage.

While using a restroom, a visibly enraged Alexa confronts and reprimands Haley, but the feud is broken up by Melissa, who is then confronted by Marylou, claiming that Alexa and her friends are each facing a life sentence. Haley thinks that those punishments should be reduced. Although her mother agrees to recommend this, they disagree on the plea bargain the girls' lawyers had arranged, knowing that lighter sentences are the appropriate punishment for the girls. The girls responsible for the attack are tried and eventually convicted: Alexa receives three years' probation, 100 hours of community service, and an order to pay Haley $1,700 in restitution, Kristin receives 15 days' imprisonment and is placed on three years' probation, Becca, Taylor, and Lauren each get one year's probation, with Lauren also being ordered to pay Haley an additional $2,000 in restitution. In addition to the above sentencing, all five of the girls are restricted from any social network sites for the full term of their probation. The film ends with Haley and Melissa, now feeling more relaxed with the girls' convictions, walking out of the courthouse and in front of the press who are about to interview them.

Cast
 Jodelle Ferland as Haley Macklin
 Anne Heche as Melissa Macklin
 James Tupper as Ray Macklin
 Tess Atkins as Alexa Simons
 Keely Purvis as Kristin Hempton
 Genevieve Buechner as Lauren Kramer 
Taylor Hui as Taylor Lu
Chanelle Peloso as Dana 
Caley Dimmock as Becca Lawrence
Linda Darlow as Marylou Simons
 Lanette Ware as DA Jane Dennett
 Rady Panov as Derek

References

External links
 
 About Girl Fight

2011 films
2011 television films
2011 crime drama films
2010s teen drama films
American crime drama films
American high school films
American teen drama films
Canadian crime drama films
Canadian teen drama films
Canadian drama television films
Crime films based on actual events
Drama films based on actual events
English-language Canadian films
Films about bullying
Films directed by Stephen Gyllenhaal
Lifetime (TV network) films
Teen crime films
American drama television films
2010s American films
2010s Canadian films